Epenwöhrden is a municipality in the district of Dithmarschen, in Schleswig-Holstein, Germany.

History
Epenwöhrden, south of Hemmingstedt, was the venue of the Battle of Hemmingstedt. In 1500 the militia of the then Farmers' Republic of Ditmarsh, led by Wulf Isebrand, defeated an army of Hans, king of the Kalmar Union, composed of Jutes, Holsteiners, and Dutch mercenaries.

References

Dithmarschen